Carsten Günter Erich Sieling (born 13 January 1959) is a German politician of the Social Democratic Party (SPD) who served as the President of the Senate and Mayor of Bremen from 2015 to 2019. His successor is Andreas Bovenschulte.

Political career
From 2009 to 2015, Sieling was a member of the Bundestag, where he served on the Finance Committee. During the time of position held, he was his parliamentary group's rapporteur on consumer protection in financial services. Between 2010 and 2013, he was a member of the Sub-Committee on Municipal Policy. From 2012, he also served as deputy chairman of the German-British Parliamentary Friendship Group.

Sieling resigned from his seat in parliament to become President of the Senate and Mayor of Bremen in July 2015, succeeding Jens Böhrnsen. As one of the state's representatives at the Bundesrat, he served on the Committee on Foreign Affairs and on the Committee on Defence. Between October 2015 and October 2016, he chaired the Conference of Ministers-President.

In the negotiations to form a coalition government under the leadership of Chancellor Angela Merkel following the 2017 federal elections, Sieling was an SPD delegate in the working group on social affairs, led by Karl-Josef Laumann, Barbara Stamm and Andrea Nahles.

Following his party's result in the 2019 state elections, Sieling resigned from his office.

Other activities

Corporate boards
 BLG Logistics, Member of the Advisory Board
 ArcelorMittal Bremen, Member of the Supervisory Board (2013-2015)
 GEWOBA AG, Member of the Supervisory Board (2003-2010)
 Bremische Gesellschaft für Stadterneuerung, Stadtentwicklung und Wohnungsbau, Member of the Supervisory Board (1999-2003)

Non-profit organizations
 Cultural Foundation of the German States (KdL), Member of the Council
 Deutsches Museum, Member of the Board of Trustees
 Friedrich Ebert Foundation (FES), Member
 German Council on Foreign Relations (DGAP), Chairman of the Task Force on International Space Policy
 IG Metall, Member
 German United Services Trade Union (ver.di), Member
 Haus & Grund Bremen, Chairman of the Board (2009-2012)

References

1959 births
Living people
Mayors of Bremen
Social Democratic Party of Germany politicians
People from Nienburg (district)
Members of the Bundestag 2013–2017
Members of the Bundestag 2009–2013